MeLA is a -long people mover in Milan's Zone 3.

The line acts as a shuttle connecting Cascina Gobba Station on Line 2 of the Milan Metro with the nearby San Raffaele Hospital.  MeLA was completed on July 12, 1999, and is operated by Azienda Trasporti Milanesi and was the first automated people mover in Italy.  Half of the line is underground as it passes through the San Raffaele Hospital complex.

References

Railway lines in Lombardy
Railway lines opened in 1999
People mover systems in Italy